Gornja Orovica is a village in Serbia. It is situated in the Ljubovija municipality, in the Mačva District of Central Serbia. The village had a Serb ethnic majority and a population of 415 in 2002.

Historical population

1948: 830
1953: 923
1961: 870
1971: 751
1981: 635
1991: 498
2002: 415

References

See also
List of places in Serbia

Populated places in Mačva District
Ljubovija